Bartholomew Joseph "Buck" Griffith  (March 3, 1896 – May 5, 1973) was a Major League Baseball player who played outfield for the Brooklyn Robins and Washington Senators.

Griffith started his professional baseball career in 1919. In 1921, he had a big season for the New Orleans Pelicans of the Southern Association, batting .355 and leading the league in hits with 224. He was subsequently signed by the National League Robins. Griffith spent the next two seasons as a backup outfielder before being traded to the Senators. In 1924, he hit poorly early in the season and was sent down to the minors.

In 191 games over three seasons, Griffith posted a .299 batting average (174-for-581) with 69 runs, 4 home runs and 72 RBIs. He recorded a .970 fielding percentage playing at all three outfield positions and first base.

His grandson Matt Williams had a lengthy career in the majors from 1987 to 2003 and was a five-time All-Star at third base. Williams also managed the Washington Nationals baseball club in 2014 and 2015.

References

External links

1896 births
1973 deaths
Major League Baseball outfielders
Brooklyn Robins players
Washington Senators (1901–1960) players
Baseball players from Missouri
Little Rock Travelers players
Chattanooga Lookouts players
Birmingham Barons players
Salt Lake City Bees players
New Orleans Pelicans (baseball) players
Kansas City Blues (baseball) players
Dallas Steers players